Puerto Rico Highway 109 (PR-109) is a rural road that travels from Añasco, Puerto Rico to San Sebastián. This road extends from its junction with PR-2 and PR-115 west of downtown Añasco and ends at PR-119 in downtown San Sebastián.

Major intersections

See also

 List of highways numbered 109

References

External links
 

109